Grey's Anatomy is an American medical drama which premiered in 2005. The following is a list of awards obtained by the show over the course of its runtime.

ALMA Awards

Critics' Choice Television Award

Directors Guild of America Awards

Hollywood Critics Association TV Awards

Humanitas Prize

Primetime Emmy Awards

GLAAD Media Awards

Golden Globe Awards

Grammy Awards

NAACP Image Awards

People's Choice Awards

PRISM Awards

Producers Guild of America

Satellite Awards

Screen Actors Guild Awards

Teen Choice Awards

Other awards

References

External links
 Awards for Grey's Anatomy at the Internet Movie Database

 
Grey's Anatomy